Golf Battle: Birdie Buddies is a South Korean television program that airs on SBS TV starting July 16, 2021. It was originally scheduled to run on every Friday night at 23:30 (KST), but was changed to every Saturday at 18:00 (KST) starting August 7 after garnering positive response from viewers.

Overview
To play golf as a team is more fun than playing alone. The three regular hosts, Lee Seung-gi, Lee Kyung-kyu, and Lee Seung-yuop each form a team to compete with one another. Each team will be rewarded or penalized with shocking punishments accordingly.

Cast

Ratings

Season 1: 2021

Season 2: 2021-2022

Season 3: 2022

Awards and nominations

References

External links
  

South Korean variety television shows
Korean-language television shows
2021 South Korean television series debuts
2021 South Korean television series endings
Seoul Broadcasting System original programming